Dozmary Pool is a small lake, in the civil parish of Altarnun on Bodmin Moor, Cornwall, UK. It originated in the post-glacial period. The outflow from the pool is into Colliford Lake and is therefore one of the sources of the River Fowey. In the past the name has been spelt as Dozmaré and as Dosmery Pool. At the end of the 19th century it was described by Sabine Baring-Gould as abounding in fish and surrounded by numerous remains of the working of flint in the Stone Age.

The pool and surrounding area was designated a Site of Special Scientific Interest in 1951 for its biological interest and is within the Cornwall Area of Outstanding Natural Beauty, (originally the Bodmin Moor AONB).

Wildlife and ecology
The oligotrophic pool is important for its palynological record (or history) of the vegetation since the last ice-age. It is also part of a network of sites in south-west England for the reconstruction of vegetation history. In the fine granitic gravel on the bottom of the pool grows spring quillwort (Isoetes echinospora). At the time of designation in 1951 it was the only known site in Cornwall, but since 1988 has been found in three nearby pools. Growing on the margins of the pool is six-stamened waterwort (Elatine hexandra), a nationally scarce plant in the UK.

He tells how some gentlemen of the district experimented to see whether the pool contained fish and found only eels. A rare cladoceran, Drepanothrix dentate and a copepod, Diaptomus vierzejskii occur in good numbers.

In 1951, at the time of designation of the Site of Special Scientific Interest, the pool was considered valuable for wintering birds and migrating wildfowl such as Eurasian coot (Fulica atra), Eurasian teal (Anas crecca) and Eurasian wigeon (A penelope). Since the opening of the Siblyback and Colliford reservoirs on Bodmin Moor, its relative importance has declined. Breeding birds around the pool include Eurasian curlew (Numenius arquata), dunlin (Calidris alpina), northern lapwing (Vanellus vanellus), common snipe (Gallinago gallinago) and European stonechat (Saxicola torquate).

Legend and literature
Dozmary Pool is one site that is claimed to be the home of the Lady of the Lake. According to the legend, it is here that King Arthur rowed out to the Lady of the Lake and received the sword Excalibur. The pool is also claimed to be the place where Bedivere returned Excalibur as Arthur lay dying after the Battle of Camlann. Another tale associated with Dozmary Pool is that of Jan Tregeagle. In search of deviant exploits, Tregeagle makes a Faustian bargain with the Devil and is given money and power. At the conclusion of his life, he is damned to the bottomless Dozmary Pool, where he is tormented to this day; it is said that Tregeagle's ghost can still be heard howling across the moor. (He was set the task of dipping the water out of Dozmary Pool with a leaking limpet shell, but decided to escape to Roche Rock before being set another task, weaving ropes from the sand of Gwenor Cove.)

Sabine Baring-Gould included an extensive article on the witch's ladder in his novel Curgenven published in 1893. In his account the ladder was made of black wool, with white and brown thread, and at every two inches it was tied around cock's feathers. The maker would weave into it aches and pains and other ailments intended for the victim. The ladder was then thrown to the bottom of Dozmary Pool. They believed that as the bubbles rose to the top of the pond, the curse was released.

Recreation
For many years Dozmary Pool was the destination for the Sunday School outing from Bolventor Methodist chapel.

References

Lakes of Cornwall
Sites of Special Scientific Interest in Cornwall
Sites of Special Scientific Interest notified in 1951
Locations associated with Arthurian legend
Bodmin Moor